Chongxi may refer to:

Chongxi (1032–1055), reign period of Emperor Xingzong of Liao
Chongxi, Yunnan, a town in Qiaojia County, Yunnan, China
Chongxi Pagoda, in Zhaoqing, Guangdong, China